Dennis Bray is an active emeritus professor at University of Cambridge. His group is also part of the Oxford Centre for Integrative Systems Biology. After a first career in Neurobiology, working on cell growth and movement, Dennis Bray moved in Cambridge to develop computational models of cell signaling, in particular in relation to bacterial chemotaxis.

On 3 November 2006 he was awarded the Microsoft European Science Award for his work on chemotaxis of E. coli.

Books 
Wetware: A Computer in Every Living Cell (2009) , 
Essential Cell Biology (2003) (with Bruce Alberts, Karen Hopkin, Alexander Jonhson, Julian Lewis, Martin Raff, Keith Roberts, Peter Walter) , 
Cell Movements: From Molecules to Motility (2000) , 
Essential Cell Biology: An Introduction to the Molecular Biology of the Cell (1997) (with Bruce Alberts, Alexander Johnson, Julian Lewis, Martin Raff, Keith Roberts, Peter Walter) , 
Molecular Biology of the Cell (3rd ed, 1994) (with Bruce Alberts, Julian Lewis, Martin Raff, Keith Roberts, James D. Watson) , 
Cell Movements (1992) , 
Molecular Biology of the Cell (2nd ed, 1989) (with Bruce Alberts, Keith Roberts, Julian Lewis, Martin Raff) , 
Molecular Biology of the Cell (1st ed, 1982) (with Bruce Alberts, Keith Roberts, Julian Lewis, Martin Raff, James D Watson) ,

Main scientific publications
 Bray D (1970) Surface movements during growth of single explanted neurons. Proc Natl Acad Sci USA, 
 Bray D (1973) Model for Membrane Movements in the Neural Growth Cone. Nature, 244: 93 - 96
 Bray D, White JG (1988) Cortical flow in animal cells. Science, 239: 883-888
 Bray D (1990) Intracellular signalling as a parallel distributed process. Journal of Theoretical Biology, 143: 215-231
 Bray D (1995) Protein molecules as computational elements in living cells.  Nature, 376: 307-312
 Bray D, Levin MD, Morton-Firth CJ (1998) Receptor clustering as a cellular mechanism to control sensitivity.  Nature, 393: 85-88

Mention in Popular Science
Professor Franklin M. Harold writes "The theme [of a protein's shape and functionality being altered by interaction with its environment] comes with numerous variations, some of which are discussed in a thought-provoking article by Dennis Bray [author references Dr. Bray's 1995 article] that examines proteins as information-processing devices."

References

External links
 Oxford Centre for Integrative Systems Biology
 Department for Dennis Bray at University of Cambridge
 Review Article version of Bray D (1995) Protein molecules as computational elements in living cells.

Academics of the University of Cambridge
20th-century British biologists
21st-century British biologists
British neuroscientists
Living people
Year of birth missing (living people)
Systems biologists